Tangemann or Tangeman is a surname of German origin. It may refer to:

Cornelius Hoagland Tangeman (1878–1928), American automobile manufacturer
Nell Tangeman (1914–1965), American opera singer

See also
John Tangeman House, a registered historic building in Wyoming, Ohio
Tange (disambiguation)

German-language surnames